Dušan "Luks" Marković (9 March 1906 – 29 November 1974) was a Serbian football player and football manager.

He was described by local press as a great, cleaver and effective striker. Anecdotally, his killer instinct was specially awake every time he played against BSK Belgrade, the best pre-war Serbian club, having scored at least once in every match he played against them. He was especially dangerous because he had the ability to shoot and surprise the goalkeepers from any angle.

He spent most of his career with FK Vojvodina where he played for 14 years, between 1921 until 1935 being one of their most influential players of the pre-war period. Afterward, he had short spells with BSK Belgrade and French club Grenoble.

He was part of the Yugoslavia national football team for some period, but he only played one match, as a substitute of the famous striker Blagoje Marjanović in a friendly match played on October 9, 1932, in Prague, against Czechoslovakia, a 2–1 win. He was part of the Yugoslav team at the 1930 FIFA World Cup, but didn't play any match.

After retiring, he remained linked to football as a manager, having coached some clubs in Yugoslavia. He coached Gragjanski Skopje in the 1938–39 Yugoslav Football Championship and Željezničar Sarajevo between 1939 and 1941.

He died in 1974, in the aftermath of a prostate surgery.

References

1906 births
1974 deaths
People from Inđija
People from the Kingdom of Croatia-Slavonia
Serbian footballers
Yugoslav footballers
Yugoslavia international footballers
1930 FIFA World Cup players
Association football forwards
FK Vojvodina players
OFK Beograd players
Grenoble Foot 38 players
Expatriate footballers in France
Yugoslav expatriate sportspeople in France
Serbian football managers
Yugoslav football managers
FK Željezničar Sarajevo managers